Ecologically sustainable development is the environmental component of sustainable development. It can be achieved partially through the use of the precautionary principle; if there are threats of serious or irreversible environmental damage, lack of full scientific certainty should not be used as a reason for postponing measures to prevent environmental degradation.
Also important is the principle of intergenerational equity; the present generation should ensure that the health, diversity and productivity of the environment is maintained or enhanced for the benefit of future generations. In order for this movement to flourish, environmental factors should be more heavily weighed in the valuation of assets and services to provide more incentive for the conservation of biological diversity and ecological integrity.



Political considerations
Effective political support is necessary for ecologically sustainable development. The mobilization of governments can be translated into action plans that are crucial to sustainable development. Development efforts can be influenced by patterns of family arrangements, work attitudes, social morality—particularly interpersonal responsibilities, hierarchy of authority, quality of scientific education and implementation, and degree of domestic stability—especially, freedom from social conflict. National policy and development planning requires three conditions to permit ecological sustainability: action-oriented values to which individuals are committed, political authorities that favour long-term ecological benefits over immediate economic gains, and a policy with a politically competent constituency.

Canada has taken an evidence based approach to sustainability development by using Environmental Sustainability Indicators as guiding tool for policy development. At the municipal level, many cities also use evidence based indicators and Ecological Indexes as a tools for policy development.

Forums for ecologically sustainable development
The World Conservation Strategy was published in 1980, becoming one of the most encouraging developments that uses a goal-oriented programme for political change concerning ecological sustainability.  The publication marked a fundamental policy shift for the global conservation movement. The traditional focus became cure rather than Prevention, confirming the growing trend on the assimilation of preservation and development aims that are key to an ecologically sustainable society. Specifically, the concentration on wildlife conservation drifted into a concern for wider strains degrading the natural environment.
It promotes the principles of sustainable development and addresses the environmental concerns introduced by economic development decisions with a format that targets a wide audience. There are three chief conservation objectives:
Maintaining essential biogeochemical cycles and life-support systems
Preserving genetic diversity
Establishing a sustainable use of species and ecosystems
Other efforts such as the World Campaign for the Biosphere present environmental obstacles constantly before governmental and scientific authorities. Nicholas Polunin, former president of the Foundation for Environmental Conservation, believed the starting point for the World Campaign effort occurred in 1966 at an UNESCO conference in Finland.  The conference examined conditions that hinder ecologically sustainable development such as rapid population growth, proliferation of nuclear weapons, and depletion of natural resources. Similarly, the Global 2000 Report to the President, presents environmental prospective conditions that are likely to worsen if public policies, institutions, and rates of technologic advancement do not change. Findings of this type prompted environmentalists and the Foundation for Environmental Conservation to initiate the World Campaign project and have included the following suggestions:
Publication and broadcast of environmental issues
Use of traditional communication mediums such as posters and automobile stickers
Distribution of increasing basic and applied environmental research results
Information about family planning and the necessity to control population growth
Designating more area as national parks or wilderness areas, including the ocean
Organization of local, state, national, and international conferences to discuss environmental issues
Encouraging sustainable uses of our natural resources
Establishment of common laws for the Earth and mankind
Obtaining support form nongovernmental organizations and institutions for the World Campaign
Attaining recognition such as "Guardians of the Biosphere Awards," for persons and/or groups that demonstrate actions to preserve the environment

See also
Permaculture
Greenhouse debt
Sustainability
Environmental regeneration

References

External links
 Australian Government - Department of Environment and Water Resources

Sustainable development